Ivan Sergeyevich Bortnik (16 April 1939 – 4 January 2019) was a Soviet and Russian film and theater actor. He was a People's Artist of Russia (2000).

He made his film debut in 1961. He was an actor with the Taganka Theatre since 1967. He was a close friend of Russian singer-songwriter, poet, and actor Vladimir Vysotsky.

Selected filmography
 1962 —  Confessions as artist Vasily
 1976 —  Sentimental Romance as Stock controller café
 1977 —  A Declaration of Love  as Kroykov
 1979 —  The Meeting Place Cannot Be Changed as Promokashka
 1981 —  Family Relations as Vladimir Konovalov
 1987 —  Mirror for a Hero as Andrei Ivanovich Nemchinov
 1990 —  Death at Movie as Vasily Kuzmich Stolbov
 1991 —  Lost in Siberia as Faina's husband
 1992 —  The Murder at Zhdanovskaya as Gleb Yarin
 1995 —  A Moslem as godfather
 1996  —  The Return of the Battleship as Syrovegin
 1998 —  Mama Don't Cry as offender
 1999 —  Strastnoy Boulevard as a man by the fire
 2002 —  Antikiller as Bedbug
 2006  —  Sonya Golden Hand as staff captain Gorelov
 2011 —  Once Upon a Time There Lived a Simple Woman  as episode

References

External links
 
 
  Иван Бортник. Зеркало для актёра , tvkultura.ru; accessed 6 January 2019. 

1939 births
2019 deaths
Soviet male stage actors
Russian male film actors
Russian male stage actors
Russian male television actors
Male actors from Moscow
20th-century Russian male actors
21st-century Russian male actors
People's Artists of Russia
Honored Artists of the RSFSR
Burials in Troyekurovskoye Cemetery